The Dakpathar Barrage is a concrete barrage across the Yamuna River adjacent to Dakpathar in Uttarakhand, India. In a run-of-the-river scheme, the barrage serves to divert water into the East Yamuna Canal for hydroelectric power production at the Dhakrani and Dhalipur Power Plants. The foundation stone for the dam was laid on 23 May 1949 by India's Prime Minister Jawaharlal Nehru.

The entrance to the canal is directly behind the dam on its left bank. Water discharged from the Dhalipur Power Plant continues along the canal until it reaches the reservoir of the Asan Barrage.

See also

List of power stations in India

References

Dams in Uttarakhand
Barrages in India
Dams on the Yamuna River
Dehradun district
Dams completed in 1965
Energy infrastructure completed in 1965
1965 establishments in Uttar Pradesh
Run-of-the-river power stations
20th-century architecture in India